Paya Bakung United Football Club (simply known as Paya Bakung United or PBU) is an Indonesian football club based in Hamparan Perak, Deli Serdang Regency, North Sumatra. They currently compete in the Liga 3 and their homeground is Paya Bakung Field.

References

External links
Paya Bakung United Instagram

Sport in North Sumatra
Football clubs in Indonesia
Football clubs in North Sumatra
Association football clubs established in 2018
2018 establishments in Indonesia